Shane Albert Doan (born October 10, 1976) is a Canadian professional ice hockey executive and former player currently serving as chief hockey development officer for the Arizona Coyotes of the National Hockey League (NHL). Doan spent the entirety of his 21-season NHL career with the Coyotes franchise, beginning with the original Winnipeg Jets in 1995 before playing in Arizona for two decades. He was the last remaining player active in the NHL from the original Winnipeg Jets franchise before he announced his retirement in the summer of 2017.

Doan led the Phoenix Coyotes in scoring in every season between 2003 to 2011. In December 2015, Doan became the Coyotes franchise's all-time leading goal scorer. He was also the longest-serving NHL captain until his retirement, serving in that capacity for the Coyotes from 2003 to 2017. Doan never won the Stanley Cup, coming closest when his Phoenix Coyotes lost to the Los Angeles Kings in the 2012 Western Conference Final.

In international competition, Doan represented Canada and won five medals (two gold, three silver) at the World Championships. He helped Canada win the World Cup championship in 2004 and was also a member of Canada's 2006 Winter Olympic team.

The Coyotes retired Doan's jersey number prior to a game against the current Winnipeg Jets on February 24, 2019. He subsequently joined the Coyotes front office on January 11, 2021.

Playing career

Kamloops Blazers

Doan began his career in the Western Hockey League (WHL) with the Kamloops Blazers in 1992, and spent three seasons with the team. He won the Memorial Cup with the Blazers in 1994 and 1995. He had his most successful season with the team during the 1994–95 season, when he recorded 94 points, helping the team win the Memorial Cup for a second straight year, and was also awarded the Stafford Smythe Memorial Trophy as the tournament's MVP. Doan loved his time in Kamloops, and returns there in the summers.

Winnipeg Jets/Arizona Coyotes
Doan was drafted by the Winnipeg Jets in the first round, seventh overall, in the 1995 NHL Entry Draft. He was the Jets' final first-round pick to play in the NHL prior to the franchise moving to Phoenix. He immediately made the transition from major junior to the NHL in 1995–96 and tallied 17 points in his rookie season with the Jets. He scored his first NHL goal against Ed Belfour of the Chicago Blackhawks, and later scored the overtime goal to win the game 6–5. Perhaps Doan's most memorable moment as a Jet was his seventh and final goal as a Jet, which came on April 12, 1996, during the team's last regular season home game, where he scored the game-winning goal against the Los Angeles Kings in the second period to make the score 4–2 for Winnipeg. The game would finish 5–3 and the win clinched a playoff spot for the Jets. In the playoffs, the Jets were matched up against the first seeded Detroit Red Wings and lost in six games.

After the Jets relocated to Phoenix and became the Coyotes the following season, Doan's points total did not improve greatly until the 1999–2000 season, when he scored 26 goals (the first of nine consecutive 20-goal seasons for Doan). After the departure of team captain Teppo Numminen, Doan assumed the captaincy in 2003–04 and scored which were then career-highs in all statistical categories with 27 goals, 41 assists and 68 points. During the season, Doan was selected to play in his first NHL All-Star Game in 2004.  He then hit the 30-goal mark for the first time in his career the following season to go with 36 assists and 66 points.

On December 13, 2005, during a game against the Montreal Canadiens, he was involved in a controversy concerning discriminatory remarks made towards French-speaking referees. Liberal MP Denis Coderre then asked to remove Doan from the Canadian team taking part in the Olympic Games. Wayne Gretzky, being the owner and head coach of the Coyotes as well as the director of the Olympic committee, decides to leave his protégé in training. In January 2006, Doan, who denies having made the remarks towards the referees, sued Coderre for defamation then in April 2007, Coderre sued in return the player of the Coyotes, also for defamation. In August 2010, the two parties decided to settle the matter amicably and Doan admits that these comments were made by a Coyotes player on the ice.

Late in the 2006–07 season, Doan agreed to a five-year, $22.75 million contract extension with the Coyotes on February 14, 2007. He responded the following season with his best season to date when he led the Coyotes in scoring in 2007–08 with 28 goals and a career-high 50 assists for 78 points. In 2008–09, Doan was selected to the 2009 NHL All-Star Game and won the inaugural elimination shootout segment of the skills competition, outlasting Marc Savard of the Boston Bruins in the seventh round. He completed that season with his second-straight 70-point season and a career-high 31 goals.

On October 18, 2010, Doan was suspended for three games for a hit on Dan Sexton of the Anaheim Ducks the night previous. The NHL's disciplinarian, Colin Campbell, ruled that the hit was "a late hit from the blind side to the head of an unsuspecting opponent", violating the NHL's ban on blindside hits to the head. It was the first suspension of Doan's career.

Doan had a successful and memorable 2011–12 season for the Coyotes, leading his team to their most successful regular season to date, as the Coyotes finished third in the Western Conference and won their first division title. Also that season, he scored 50 points (22 goals and 28 assists) and his first NHL hat-trick, on January 7, 2012, at 19:59 of the third period in the 1,161st game of his NHL career. Doan would also lead the Coyotes to their most successful playoff performance, contributing nine points to lead the Coyotes to their first and second playoff series victories over the Chicago Blackhawks in six games and the Nashville Predators in five, respectively, as well as the team's first ever conference final appearance, where they would lose in five games to the eventual Stanley Cup champions Los Angeles Kings.

On September 14, 2012, Doan agreed to a four-year, $21.2 million contract extension with the Coyotes. As of the start of the 2014–15 season, Doan was the all-time leader in games played with the Jets/Coyotes franchise. And by scoring two goals and an assist in the February 12, 2016, game against the Calgary Flames, he moved into first place all-time in points for the Jets/Coyotes franchise with 931.

On December 29, 2015, Doan recorded his second career hat trick in a 7–5 loss against the Chicago Blackhawks. With this accomplishment, Doan became the 15th player ever to record two hat tricks after turning 35. He also tied Dale Hawerchuk's franchise record for all-time goals scored. On December 31, 2015 Doan scored twice against the Winnipeg Jets to become the all-time leading goal scorer for the Winnipeg/Phoenix/Arizona franchise with 381 goals.

On July 12, 2016, Doan agreed to a one-year, $5 million contract with the Coyotes. As of the start of the 2016–17 season, Doan is the longest-serving captain in the NHL, having been named Coyotes captain prior to the 2003–04 season, is tenth in points among active NHL players, and is two points away from surpassing Dale Hawerchuk in all-time Jets/Coyotes points. Entering the season, he is 96th in all-time NHL points. On June 19, 2017, it was announced the Coyotes were parting ways with Doan, leaving him unprotected in 2017 NHL Expansion Draft and opting not to re-sign him for the 2017–18 season. The Coyotes left a standing offer to Doan to remain with the team in a non-playing role.

On August 30, 2017, Doan officially announced his retirement from the NHL. He became the first player to have his jersey number retired by the Coyotes, with the team raising his No. 19 to the rafters at Gila River Arena prior to a game against the Winnipeg Jets on February 24, 2019.

On January 11, 2021, the Coyotes hired Doan in an executive capacity as the team's chief hockey development officer.

International play

Doan made his international debut for Canada at the 1999 World Championships in Norway and finished fourth with the team. He then won his first gold medal four years later at the 2003 World Championships in Finland. Prior to the 2004–05 NHL lock-out, Doan competed in the 2004 World Cup and scored the game-winning goal in the finals against Finland to win the championship. Doan had also been named to Canada's 2004 World Championship team several months earlier, but could not attend due to injury.

In 2005, Doan was named an alternate captain for Canada and helped lead the team to a silver medal at the World Championships in Austria. Two years later, he was promoted to team captain at the 2007 World Championships in Moscow. During the tournament, he scored the game-winning goal in a 4–2 preliminary round victory over Norway, then scored a hat-trick in a span of 6:25 in a 6–3 qualification round victory over Belarus. Canada went undefeated en route to a 4–2 gold medal game victory over Finland in the final. He remained captain for the 2008 World Championships and won his second silver, losing to Russia in the gold medal game.

Controversy
When Doan was selected for the 2006 Olympics, Canadian Liberal Member of Parliament Denis Coderre wrote a letter to Hockey Canada president Bob Nicholson asking him to remove Doan from the team unless Doan apologized for an alleged slur of French-Canadians he used on December 13, 2005, against a Quebecer referee during a game against the Montreal Canadiens. In January 2006, Doan filed a lawsuit against Coderre for defamation, seeking $250,000 in damages and promising to contribute any damage awards to charity. Coderre filed a counter-suit in April 2007, seeking $45,000 in damages.

When Doan was selected as captain on the 2007 Canadian national men's hockey team, a Canadian Official Languages parliamentary committee demanded Hockey Canada appear before the committee to explain its decision to name Doan as captain in light of the aforementioned alleged comment. Doan's selection was maintained, citing that an NHL investigation had cleared him of any wrongdoing.

Prior to Doan's trial, set to take place in September 2010, he and Coderre agreed to an out of court settlement, stating that the Superior Court of Montreal could put its resources to better use if the matter was settled. Doan stated in the settlement that another player on the ice did utter the racial comments. The settlement also stated Coderre was wrong.

Personal life
Doan was born on October 10, 1976, in Halkirk, Alberta, to Bernie and Bernice Doan. His father, Bernie Doan (born June 27, 1951), was drafted by the St. Louis Blues in the sixth round, 80th overall, of the 1971 NHL Amateur Draft and briefly played professionally during the 1971–72 season with the Kansas City Blues and Toledo Hornets. His parents ran a Christian summer camp in Halkirk called Circle Square Ranch. Growing up in a religious family, Doan continues to be a practising Christian; he writes the Bible verse Romans 8:28 on his hockey sticks.

Doan and his wife Andrea have four children and reside in Scottsdale, Arizona. The family spends their summers in Kamloops where Doan played junior hockey and met his wife. His son Josh currently plays for Arizona State University, and was drafted by the Arizona Coyotes in the 2nd round of the 2021 NHL Entry Draft.

Doan is a second cousin of Carey Price, a goaltender for the Montreal Canadiens, and also a first cousin of Keaton Ellerby, a member of the Sheffield Steelers  of the Elite Ice Hockey League, and Catriona Le May Doan, a two-time Olympic gold medalist in speed skating through marriage to her husband Bart Doan.

In April 2011, Doan, along with his brother Brook, were the "prey" on the television series Mantracker, successfully completing it.

Doan served as a pallbearer at the funeral service of American politician John McCain in Arizona.

Career statistics

Regular season and playoffs

International

Awards and honours

Records
Arizona Coyotes/Winnipeg Jets record for career points (972).
Arizona Coyotes/Winnipeg Jets record for career goals (402).
Arizona Coyotes/Winnipeg Jets record for games played (1540).
Arizona Coyotes/Winnipeg Jets record for career game-winning goals (69).
Arizona Coyotes/Winnipeg Jets record for career power play goals (125).
Arizona Coyotes/Winnipeg Jets record for career shots on goal (3801).

References

External links

 
 
 
 
 

1976 births
Arizona Coyotes players
Canadian Christians
Canadian ice hockey right wingers
Ice hockey people from Alberta
Ice hockey players at the 2006 Winter Olympics
Kamloops Blazers players
King Clancy Memorial Trophy winners
Living people
National Hockey League All-Stars
National Hockey League first-round draft picks
Olympic ice hockey players of Canada
People from the County of Paintearth No. 18
Phoenix Coyotes players
Springfield Falcons players
Winnipeg Jets (1979–1996) draft picks
Winnipeg Jets (1979–1996) players